Choi Yeong-suk (born 14 May 1947) is a South Korean gymnast. She competed in five events at the 1964 Summer Olympics.

References

External links
 

1947 births
Living people
South Korean female artistic gymnasts
Olympic gymnasts of South Korea
Gymnasts at the 1964 Summer Olympics
Place of birth missing (living people)
20th-century South Korean women